The 2011–12 Oklahoma State Cowboys basketball team represented Oklahoma State University in the 2011–12 NCAA Division I men's basketball season. This was head coach Travis Ford's fourth season at Oklahoma State. The Cowboys competed in the Big 12 Conference and played their home games at the Gallagher-Iba Arena. They finished the season 15-18, 7-11 in Big 12 play to finish in seventh place. They advanced to the quarterfinals of the Big 12 tournament where they lost to Missouri. They did not receive an at-large invitation to the 2012 NCAA tournament.

Pre-season

Departures

Recruits

Roster
Source

Rankings

Schedule and results
Source
All times are Central

|-
!colspan=9 style="background:#000000; color:#FF6600;"| Non-Conference Regular Season

|-
!colspan=9 style="background:#000000; color:#FF6600;"| Big 12 Regular Season

    

|-
! colspan=9 style="background:#FF6600; color:#000000;"|2012 Big 12 men's basketball tournament

|-

See also
Oklahoma State Cowboys basketball (men's basketball only)
2011-12 Big 12 Conference men's basketball season

References

Oklahoma State
Oklahoma State Cowboys basketball seasons
2011 in sports in Oklahoma
2012 in sports in Oklahoma